"For a Friend" is a single from the British pop duo The Communards taken from their 1987 album Red.

The song is an emotional ballad and was written in the memory of Mark Ashton, a friend of Jimmy Somerville and Richard Coles. Mark Hooper of The Rough Guide to Rock writes that this cut may be Somerville's "most impassioned moment". "For a Friend" reached number 28 on the British charts.

In media
The official music video for the song was directed by Andy Morahan.
In 2014, the song was featured on the soundtrack to the film Pride. It was also one of the songs played at Burberry’s February 2018 show, presented on 17 February at the Dimco Buildings in West London, marking Christopher Bailey’s final outing for the brand.

Track and format listing

Chart performance

Weekly charts

Notes

References

External links
 
 
 
 

1988 songs
1988 singles
The Communards songs
LGBT-related songs
London Records singles
Music videos directed by Andy Morahan
Song recordings produced by Stephen Hague
Songs written by Jimmy Somerville
Songs about HIV/AIDS
Commemoration songs